Lemes is a surname. Notable people with the surname include:

Bernardo Lemes (born 2002), Brazilian footballer
Caíque Venâncio Lemes (born 1993), Brazilian footballer
Gonzalo Lemes (born 1980), Uruguayan footballer
Manoel Cristiano Ribeiro Lemes (born 1989), Brazilian footballer